Melva Claire Saunders (m. Hancock - born 9 May 1931) is a retired Australian women's basketball player.

Biography
Hancock played for the Australia women's national basketball team at the 1957 FIBA World Championship for Women, hosted by Brazil. Hancock commenced playing basketball as a junior in 1949 and represented New South Wales (NSW) at the Australian Championships in 1955, 1956, 1960 and 1962. She was a key member of the Newcastle team that won eight straight NSW Country and NSW State championships.

For her participation as a player, manager and administrator of the game from 1949 to 1978, Hancock was inducted into the Basketball NSW Hall of Fame in 2013. Her married name is Melva Hancock.

References

Living people
Australian women's basketball players
1931 births